Alan Crawford may refer to:

Alan Crawford (Australian rules footballer) (1916–1988), Australian rules footballer
Alan Crawford (English footballer) (born 1953), English footballer and manager
Alan Pell Crawford (born 1953), American author and journalist
Allan Crawford (music publisher) Australian music publisher who formed the sales and programming company for Radio Atlanta

See also
Allen Crawford (born 1968), author and illustrator